Kobra is a village in Põhja-Pärnumaa Parish, Pärnu County in western-central Estonia.

References

 

Villages in Pärnu County